Miles Meadows (Born April 24) is a Canadian and British citizen, he has worked on films in Canada, the United States, and France, and has appeared in roles speaking French, (Le Petit Village), directed by Genieve Duliscouet, English, Italian and Latin, (The Strange Case Of DJ Cosmic).

Biography
Meadows was born in Labrador City, Newfoundland and Labrador. He grew up in British Columbia, lived in England briefly as a child and Los Angeles for three years. Though his home is in  Vancouver British Columbia, as of 2014 Meadows resides in London, England.

Acting career
Meadows became recognizable after rolls on MTV's 2gether, multiple episodes of Showtime's The L Word and the highest Rated episode of Jeremiah, "And the Ground, Sown with Salt" (along with Luke Perry, Jason Priestley and Malcolm-Jamal Warner). He has performed in two Stephen King films, The Mangler 2 where "critics" compared him to a young Vince Neil and NBC's remake of Carrie where he received rave reviews from traditional media and online critics.

Meadows took a step back from acting in 2007 to take care of his father, who had long been suffering from Parkinson's disease. In 2008, Meadows left performing entirely when his spouse was diagnosed with an extremely rare form of cancer.  He was with his father when he died August 9, 2009. (For the full interview see the December issue of Brazilian Caras Magazine) At the time Meadows was a medical first responder for the City Of Vancouver he carries two degrees.

Selected filmography

References

Arrow Reviews

External links
 MySpace
 

Living people
Male actors from Newfoundland and Labrador
Canadian male film actors
Canadian male television actors
People from Labrador City
Year of birth missing (living people)